Herbold is a surname. Notable people with the surname include:

Bob Herbold (born 1942), American writer
Fred Herbold (1875–1914), American football player and coach
Greg Herbold (born 1962), American cyclist
Lisa Herbold (born 1967), American politician
Patricia L. Herbold (born 1940), American chemist and diplomat